The Canadian Association of Optometrists (CAO) is the national voice of optometry, providing leadership and support to its members to enhance the delivery of eye health and vision care for all Canadians. CAO was formally constituted with the proclamation of a federal act to incorporate the Canadian Association of Optometrists on June 30, 1948.

Membership 
More than 5,400 optometrists comprise the membership of CAO, representing approximately 85% of doctors of optometry (ODs) in Canada.

History 
At a meeting in Ottawa on July 7, 1941 six provincial representatives resolved to organize the Canadian Association of Optometrists. The first President was Dr. Herb McClung of Saskatchewan, who had promoted the idea of a national association since 1924. Four objectives were put forward at the meeting:
 To consider and act upon all matters which have Dominion-wide effect upon Optometry and which do not lie specifically within the jurisdiction of any individual province;
 To promote by all means possible the usefulness of Optometry;
 To promote good fellowship and friendly intercourse between the several provincial associations;
 To advance optometric education.

The association pursued national recognition and CAO was formally constituted with the proclamation of a federal act to incorporate the Canadian Association of Optometrists on June 30, 1948.

Awards 
Vision Champion Award:The Canadian Association of Optometrists' Vision Champion Award is the only award presented to the general public (non-optometric community) by the CAO. It honours individuals or organizations for distinguished service to the eye care and vision health of all Canadians.
 CAO Honorary Life Membership is conferred only upon a person who has rendered exceptional service in or for the profession of optometry or whom it is desired to honour for outstanding public service in the vision and eye care field.  
 CAO President's Award – The highest award CAO presents for members who have made an exceedingly significant contribution to the advancement of the profession of Optometry in Canada through his or her work within the previous ten years.

Executive directors 
 Edward B. Higgins Manager
 James (Jim) Gilmore Executive Director January 1964 – January 1968
 H.G. (Mel) Mellow Executive Director February 1968 – May 1971
 Gregory (Greg) J. Walsh Executive Director June 1971 – October 1974
 Donald (Don) N. Schaefer Executive Director October 1974 – September 1983
 Gérard A. Lambert Executive Director September 1983 – June 1992
 Michael J. DiCola Administrative Officer/Executive Director July 1992 – June 1998
 Glenn Campbell Executive Director June 1998 – July 2013
 Laurie Clement, CEO, July 2013 – August 2019
 François Couillard, CEO, August 2019 – present

References

Association of Optometrists
Medical and health organizations based in Ontario